A conceptual system is a system that is composed of non-physical objects, i.e. ideas or concepts. In this context a system is taken to mean "an interrelated, interworking set of objects".

Overview 
A conceptual system is a conceptual model. Such systems may be related to any topic from formal science to individual imagination. Conceptual systems may be found within the human mind, as works of art and fiction, and within the academic world. Indeed, this article may be understood as a conceptual system because it includes a set of interrelated concepts.

Broadly, when a conceptual system includes a range of values, ideas, and beliefs the conceptual system is said be a view of the world. In psychology and social work, a conceptual system may refer to an individual's mental model of the world. In humans, a conceptual system may be understood as kind of a metaphor for the world. In science, there are many forms of conceptual systems including laws, theories, and models. Those conceptual systems may be developed through inductive reasoning, deductive reasoning, and empirical analysis.

The idea that the human mind might contain conceptual systems goes back at least as far as Kelly's personal construct theory in 1955. More recently, many scholars discuss conceptual systems and the importance of understanding them (c.f. Bateson, Luhmann, Senge, Quine, Eco, Umpleby, and Wallis). On the personal level, the human mind is generally held to contain a wide range of conceptual systems although they are not well organized. Indeed, our minds are full of conflicting mental models which makes decision making unreliable - particularly in large-scale, complex situations.

Within the academic literature, each theory may be understood as a conceptual system. Conceptual systems are generally held to have greater value when they are more useful, based on more research, and are more systemically interrelated.

Generally, that validity may also be described in terms of its internal coherence and the correspondence between the conceptual system and other systems (e.g. social systems or physical systems). Correspondence is generally tested by empirical analysis and conditions of falsifiability. The conceptual system may then be said to model the physical or social system and serve as a guide for individual behavior or academic research.

Examples 
Examples of conceptual systems include:
Assumptions
Business decision map
Entity-relationship model
Ethics
Laws of science
Metalogic
Mind map
Model
Object-oriented programming: allows conceptual systems to be defined in a robust manner.
Policy
Schema
Strategic plan
Theory
Unified Modeling Language
Values

See also 

 Closed system
 Concept
 Concept and object
 Concept learning
 Concept map
 Conceptual art
 Conceptual blending
 Conceptual clustering
 Conceptual combination
 Conceptual framework
 Conceptual object
 Conceptual schema
 Formal concept analysis
 Metaphysics
 Meta system
 Open system
 Physical system
 Physical object
 Simulated reality
 Virtual reality

References

Further reading 
 Lawrence W. Barsalou, "Continuity of the conceptual system across species", in: Trends in Cognitive Sciences, Vol 9, Iss 7, July 2005, Pp. 309–311.
 Harold I. Brown (2006), Conceptual systems, Routledge, UK, Dec 2006.
 George Lakoff, "What is a Conceptual System?", in: Willis F. Overton & David Stuart Palermo eds., The Nature and Ontogenesis of Meaning, 1994.
 Stuart A. Umpleby (1994), The cybernetics of conceptual systems, Paper prepared for the Institute for Advanced Studies, Vienna, Austria.

External links
 Language and Conceptual Systems. at Berkeley.edu, 2007.